The Oulad Abdoun Basin (also known as the Ouled Abdoun Basin or Khouribga Basin) is a phosphate sedimentary basin located in Morocco, near the city of Khouribga. It is the largest in Morocco, comprising 44% of Morocco's phosphate reserves, and at least 26.8 billion tons of phosphate.   It is also known as an important site for vertebrate fossils, with deposits ranging from the Late Cretaceous (Cenomanian-Turonian) to the Eocene epoch (Ypresian), a period of about 25 million years.

Geography 
The Oulad Abdoun is located west of the Atlas Mountains, near the city of Khouribga. The Oulad Abdoun is the largest and northernmost of Morocco's major phosphate basins, which from northeast to southwest, include the Ganntour, Meskala, and Oued Eddahab (Laayoune-Baa) basins.

Paleobiota

The Oulad Abdoun Basin stretches from late Cretaceous to the Eocene, and contains abundant marine vertebrate fossils, including sharks, bony fish, turtles, crocodilians, and other reptiles, as well as sea birds and a small number of terrestrial mammals.

Bony fish

Sharks

Other Cartilaginous Fish

Crocodylomorphs

Lepidosaurs

Plesiosaurs

Turtles

Pterosaurs

Dinosaurs
Bird fossils are common in the Basin, which includes the oldest birds in Africa. At least three orders and several families of sea birds are represented, including Procellariiformes (albatrosses and petrels, fossils assignable to Diomedeidae and Procellariidae), Pelecaniformes (pelicans and allies, fossils assignable to Phaethontidae, Prophaethontidae, Fregatidae and Pelagornithidae), and Anseriformes (waterfowl, including fossil Presbyornithidae).

Mammals

See also

Cretaceous–Paleogene extinction event
Fauna of Africa
List of dinosaur bearing rock formations

References

External links
 Fossil Vertebrates from the Phosphate Basins of Morocco, paleontological research from the Muséum national d'Histoire naturelle, Paris.

Sedimentary basins of Africa
Cenozoic paleontological sites of Africa
Geology of Morocco
Cretaceous paleontological sites of Africa
Eocene paleontological sites
Phosphate mines
Cretaceous System of Africa